This is a list of compositions by Czech pianist and composer Alexander Dreyschock.

Piano

Piano Solo
8 Exercises de Bravoure en Forme de Valse, Op. 1
3 Andante & 4 Impromptus caractéristiques, Op. 3
Souvenir, Op. 4
3 Thèmes variés, Op. 6
Andante cantabile, Op. 7
Souvenir d'Amitié Op. 8
Scène romantique, Op. 9
La Campanella, Op. 10
Variations sur un Thème original, Op. 11
Rondo militaire #1, Op. 13
Mazurka, Op. 14
Les Adieux de Varsovie, Op. 15
Nocturne, Op. 16/1
Bluette, Op. 16/2
l'Absence, Op. 17
Les Regrets, Op. 18
Scherzo, Op. 19
Rondo militaire #2, Op. 20
Impromptu, Op. 21
Variations for the left hand alone, Op. 22
Andante inquietoso, Op. 23
Le Ruisseau, Op. 24
La Coupe - Chanson à Boire, Op. 25
Le Vallon – Idylle, Op. 26
Nocturne, Op. 28
L'Inquietude Op.29 - Morceau de Concert 
Piano Sonata in D Minor, Op. 30
Fantaisie, Op. 31
Rondo Brillant, Op. 32
Impromptu, Op. 33
Souvenir de Pest, Op. 34
Preludio e Fuga, Op. 35
Nocturne, Op. 36
Rhapsodie, Op. 37
Rhapsodie, Op. 38
Rhapsodie, Op. 39
Rhapsodie zum Wintermärchen, Op. 40
Souvenir de Berlin, Op. 41
Pastorella, Op. 42
Scherzo, Op. 43
Capriccio, Op. 44
Morceau caractéristique, Op. 45
Rhapsodie, Op. 46
Andantino, Op. 47
Napolitana – Canzonetta, Op. 48
Romance en Forme d'Etude, Op. 49
Andantino con Variazione, Op. 51
La Gaîté - Morceau caractéristique, Op. 52
Bluette, Op. 53
Nocturne, Op. 54
Fantaisie, Op. 55
Fantaisie, Op. 56
Allegro spirituoso, Op. 57
Impromptu, Op. 58
La Gentillesse – Rondoletto, Op. 59
Le jeune Guerrier, Op. 60
Scène champêtre #1, Op. 61
Le Voyageur – Nocturne, Op. 62
Romance sans Paroles, Op. 63
Mazurka, Op. 64
Scène champêtre #2, Op. 65
La Résolution, Op. 67
Le Naufrage, Op. 68
Le Festin de Noces Vénitiens, Op. 69
La Sirène, Op. 70
Nocturne, Op. 71
Ballata, Op. 72
Invitation à la polka, Op. 73
La Fête innocente, Op. 74
La Source (Souvenir de Teplitz), Op. 75
Morceau Pathétique, Op. 76
La Rêverie, Op. 81
Souvenir d'Irlande - 3 Pièces, Op. 82
2 Impromptus, Op. 83
Le Chant du Combat, Op. 84
La Mélancolie, Op. 85
Grand Caprice de Concert #1, Op. 86
Élégie, Op. 87
Grande Caprice de Concert #2, Op. 88
3 Scènes de Chasse, Op. 89
Fleurs de Bois, Op. 90
Impromptu en forme d’une Mazurka, Op. 91
Soirée D’hiver, Op. 92
Invitation à la Mazurka, Op. 94
Hommage à Vienne – Nocturne, Op. 95
La Fontaine, Op. 96
Le Contraste, Op. 97
Rhapsodie, Op. 98/
Piano Pieces, Op. 98/2
Impromptu, Op. 100
Nocturne, Op. 102
Morceau caractéristique, Op. 103
Ballade, Op. 104
Souvenir de Copenhague, Op. 106
Scherzo, Op. 107
Styrienne original, Op. 108
3 Mazurkas, Op. 109
Élégie, Op. 110
Le Rêve – Spinnerlied, Op. 111
Rastlose Liebe, Op. 112
Aus der Ferne, Op. 114
2 Romances, Op. 115
Impromptu, Op. 116
Grande Fantaisie, Op. 117
Pensée fugitive, Op. 118
Allegro appassionato, Op. 119
Une Suite de 3 Nocturnes, Op. 120
Schlummerlied, Op. 121
Fantaisie Mazurka, Op. 124
La Mélancolie et Inspiration, Op. 125
Paraphrase sur des Motifs de l'Opéra Halka, Op. 126
Souvenir de Norderney, Op. 127
Spinnerlied, Op. 128
Grande Variation on God Save the Queen for the left hand alone, Op. 129
Das Elfenleben, Op. 130
3 Piano Pieces, Op. 131
Sur l'Eau et dans la Foret - 2 Piano Pieces, Op. 132
Romance from Schubert's Die Verschworenen, Op. 133
Bluette Ein Abend an der Alster, Op. 135
La Babillarde, Op. 136
Élégie, Op. 138
Nocturne, Op. 139
Chanson sans Paroles, Op. 140
3 Piano Pieces, Op. 141
Six Piano Pieces, Op. 142
L'Adieu – Impromptu, Op. 143
Le Trémolo

Piano, Four hands
Polonaise for piano four hands, Op. 5

Chamber music

Violin and Piano
2 Morceaux for Violin and Piano in collaboration with H. Panofka, Op. 79

String Quartet
String Quartet, Op. 105

Orchestral

Piano and Orchestra
Große Fantasie for Piano and Orchestra, Op. 12
Konzertstück in C Minor for Piano and Orchestra, Op. 27
L’inquietude for Piano and Orchestra, Op. 29
Piano Concerto in D Minor, Op. 137

Other
Overture for Orchestra, Op. 50

Choral Music
Psalmen des Friedens, Op. 123 (?)

Lieder
Elle manque à ma Felicité, Op. 122 (?)
Drei Lieder

External links
 List of compositions (in German)
 List of compositions

Dreyschock, Alexander